Cetnica  is a village in the municipality of Gradačac, Bosnia and Herzegovina.

References

Populated places in Gradačac